Phillips Ridge is a mountain in central Vancouver Island, British Columbia, Canada, located  southeast of Gold River.

See also
 List of mountains in Canada

References

Vancouver Island Ranges
One-thousanders of British Columbia
Clayoquot Land District